Werner Co. is a privately owned company involved with the manufacturing and distribution of aluminum and fiberglass ladders, light duty construction equipment, fall protection equipment, and similar products. Werner Co. is headquartered in Itasca, Illinois. Werner's customer care division is located in Greenville, Pennsylvania.

History

Werner Co. was founded in 1922 by Richard D. Werner as "R. D. Werner Co., Inc.," which specialized in metal moldings.  R. D. Werner Co., Inc. became a leader in plastics extrusion during the World War II restrictions on civilian metal usage. After the war, Werner started working with aluminum and developed an emphasis on producing aluminum ladders. Werner began production of fiberglass ladders in 1963. In 1997, the company restructured, and sold a majority holding to the international investment group Investcorp S.A.

In December 2005, the Extruded Products Division (formerly WXP, Inc.) was sold to HIG Capital. Werner reported audited net sales of $472.3 million for the year ending Dec. 31, 2005. As of March 31, 2006, Werner reported assets of $201 million and liabilities of $473.4 million. Werner Co. filed for Chapter 11 protection under the bankruptcy code in Delaware on June 12, 2006, primarily due to excessive leverage, significant increases in raw material costs, and the loss of one of its largest customers. On June 8, 2007, a new company was formed by the major creditors to purchase substantially all the assets of the old company.

Werner Co. operates as an international subsidiary of New Werner Holding Co., Inc. with manufacturing, warehousing, sales, and distribution facilities in the United States, Australia, Canada, China, Mexico, Vietnam and the United Kingdom.

References

External links
 Corporate Site
 Werner Ladders Site
 Green Bull Site
 Keller Site
 KNAACK Site
 WEATHER GUARD Site

Manufacturing companies based in Pennsylvania
American companies established in 1922
Privately held companies based in Pennsylvania
Manufacturing companies established in 1922
1922 establishments in Pennsylvania
American companies established in 2007
Manufacturing companies established in 2007
2007 establishments in Pennsylvania
Tool manufacturing companies of the United States